Three ships of the Royal Norwegian Navy have borne the name HNoMS Sleipner.  The name is derived from Sleipnir - Odin's magical eight-legged steed, and the greatest of all horses:

  was a  launched in 1877 and scrapped in 1935.
  was a  launched in 1936 and scrapped in 1959.
  was a  launched in 1963 and decommissioned in 1992 to be expended as a target ship.

Royal Norwegian Navy ship names